Mujib (Mujīb ) is one of the names of God in Islam, meaning "Answerer" or "Responsive". It can not be used as a personal name, as short form of the Abdul Mujib which means" Servant of the Answerer" as according to Islamic ruling a human being or any other thing can not be called or named after Allah.

In the Qur'an
 It appears once in the Qur'an, in Surah Hud, ayah 61:

Names of God in Islam